The Thames Valley Police and Crime Commissioner (PCC) is a police and crime commissioner, an elected official tasked with setting out the way crime is tackled by Thames Valley Police in the ceremonial English counties of Berkshire, Buckinghamshire and Oxfordshire. The post was created in November 2012, following an election held on 15 November 2012, and replaced the Thames Valley Police Authority. The current incumbent is Matthew Barber, who represents the Conservative Party.

List of Sussex Police and Crime Commissioners

Elections 
Elections for the role of Thames Valley Police and Crime Commissioner took place in 2012, 2016 and 2021. The PCC is elected by a supplementary vote system with a term of four years; however, elections scheduled for 2020 were postponed until 2021 due to the COVID-19 pandemic.

2021 
Voters in the Thames Valley Police Area voted for their next PCC on Thursday 6 May 2021, on the same day as local elections were held across the United Kingdom. Votes were counted in 13 locations in the Thames Valley area on Monday 10 May 2021 including at Spiceball Leisure Centre in Banbury, where the results were announced.

Results

2016 
In 2016, Anthony Stansfield was re-elected for a second term as Thames Valley PCC.

Results

2012 
In 2012, Anthony Stansfield was elected as the first PCC for the Thames Valley Police Area.

Results

References 

Police and crime commissioners in England